State Route 3 (SR 3) is a major north–south (physically northeast-southwest) highway in Ohio which leads from Cincinnati to Cleveland by way of Columbus. It is the second longest state route in Ohio. Because of this, the road is also known as the 3-C Highway, a designation which predates the Ohio state highway system. It is the only state route to enter all three of Ohio's largest cities, though it has largely been bypassed by Interstate 71 (I-71). The route's southern terminus is in downtown Cincinnati at the U.S. Route 27 (US 27)/US 52/US 127 concurrency, which is also the western terminus of US 22. From there, SR 3 continues solo to Sunbury, where it joins US 36 for just over  until it reaches Mount Vernon. SR 3 ends in Cleveland at Public Square, with the last several miles concurrent with US 42 from Parma. It is one of nine other routes to enter downtown Cleveland at Public Square.

History

1932 – Alignment from Cincinnati to Washington Court House dually certified with US 22; alignment from Washington Court House to Columbus dually certified with US 62.
1938 – Medina-Parma alignment changed to the pre-1926 routing and dually certified with US 42; previous alignment signed SR 200 until 1939.
1939 – Medina-Parma alignment switched back to current alignment.
1961 – SR 3 routed to new freeway alignment from Harrisburg to Columbus.
1962 – Harrisburg-Columbus alignment dually certified as I-71.
1967 – Reverted to US 62 alignment from Harrisburg to Columbus.

Major intersections

References

External links

003
Transportation in Hamilton County, Ohio
Transportation in Warren County, Ohio
Transportation in Clinton County, Ohio
Transportation in Fayette County, Ohio
Transportation in Madison County, Ohio
Transportation in Pickaway County, Ohio
Transportation in Franklin County, Ohio
Transportation in Delaware County, Ohio
Transportation in Knox County, Ohio
Transportation in Ashland County, Ohio
Transportation in Holmes County, Ohio
Transportation in Wayne County, Ohio
Transportation in Medina County, Ohio
Transportation in Cuyahoga County, Ohio
Roads in Cincinnati
Transportation in Columbus, Ohio
Transportation in Cleveland
U.S. Route 42